Mount Vernon West station is a commuter rail stop on the Metro-North Railroad's Harlem Line, located in Mount Vernon, New York.

History
The Mount Vernon West station was originally built in the early 1840s by the New York and Harlem Railroad along the median of what is today MacQuestor Parkway just south of Mount Vernon Avenue. The line was electrified and realigned in southern Mount Vernon by the New York Central and Hudson River Railroad and commissioned the architectural firm of Warren and Wetmore to build a new station along the realigned segment in 1914, although the bridge over Mount Vernon Avenue was built in 1910. As with most NYCRR stations in Westchester County, the station became a Penn Central station once the NYC & Pennsylvania Railroads merged in 1968, and eventually became part of the MTA's Metro-North Railroad.

Station layout
The station has two slightly offset high-level island platforms, each 12 cars long. Its ticket office and waiting area are at the bottom level of the Bank of New York building on Mount Vernon Avenue.

As of August 2006, daily commuter ridership was 1,172 and there are 221 parking spots. The station house which is addressed at 156 South West Street and still bears the name New York Central Railroad on its façade, is used primarily for retail, and tickets can be purchased from beneath the platforms.

References

External links

 Entrance from Google Maps Street View
Platforms from Google Maps Street View
Waiting Room from Google Maps Street View

Metro-North Railroad stations in New York (state)
Former New York Central Railroad stations
Mount Vernon, New York
Railway stations in the United States opened in 1914
Warren and Wetmore buildings
Railway stations in Westchester County, New York
1914 establishments in New York (state)
Transportation in Westchester County, New York